Scripture in Song Recordings Limited was the name of a recording company registered in 1973 by Dave and Dale Garratt of New Zealand, with the aim of better incorporating scripture into contemporary worship music.  The Garratts produced a series of albums and songbooks of the same name, and became leading musicians and songwriters in the Charismatic movement in the 1970s and 80s. They have gone on to become leading figures in the global school of ethnodoxology, a discipline which helps indigenous cultures understand and express Christian doctrine in their own musical forms.

The company was struck off by the New Zealand Companies Office in 2002.

The term Scripture in Song is also used more widely to describe the movement to incorporate scripture within contemporary worship music.

Albums
Albums produced in the Scripture in Song series include:
The Early Years 1968-1985 (1993)
Scripture in Song (1968)
Thou Art Worthy (1970)
Prepare Ye The Way (1972)
Praise The Name Of Jesus (1974)
All Thy Works Shall Praise Thee (1977)
Songs of Praise - Scripture in Song (1980)
Songs of the Kingdom (1981)
Call To War (1983)
Songs Of The Nations: All Heaven (1993)
Songs Of The Nations: We Will Triumph (1993)
Songs Of The Nations: Come With Praise (1993)
Songs Of The Nations: Celebrate (1993)

Website https://www.scriptureinsong.org/

References

Let My People Go That They May Worship Me, Ethnodoxology, Vol. 2, No. 2, 2003, pages 8–10
 Crosswalk.com:  10 Questions with David Garratt
One-Way.org - Classic Jesus Music

New Zealand record labels
Christian record labels
Record labels established in 1973
1973 establishments in New Zealand
Contemporary worship music
Contemporary Christian music
Hymnals